The Zamzama Gun (meaning "thunder" or "roar", sometimes written "Zam-Zammah" or "Zam-Zammeh") also known as Kim’s Gun or Bhangianwali Toap is a large-bore cannon. It was cast in about 1757   in Lahore (present-day Pakistan) during the Durrani Empire. It is currently on display in front of the Lahore Museum in Lahore, Pakistan.

The gun 
This gun, one of the largest ever made in the sub-continent, was cast at Lahore along with another gun of the same size in 1757 by Shah Nazir (a metalsmith of the former Mughal viceroy Muin-ul-Mulk), under the directions of Shah Wali Khan, who was prime minister in the reign of the Afghan King Ahmed Shah Durrani.

Gun alloy composition and metal acquisition 
The Zamzama was said to have been 'made of copper and brass'.

Persian inscriptions 
The gun has the date of manufacture, names of the monarch and the technician along with verses in Persian moulded with floral patterns all over the barrel. The front inscription reads: "By the order of the Emperor, DuriDurran, Shah Wali Khan Wazir made the gun named Zamzama or the Taker of Strongholds." The longer inscription at the back eulogizes its bulk and invincibility: "A destroyer even of the strongholds of the heaven." Verses at the end of the inscription contain a chronogram: "From reason I enquire of the year of its manufacture; Struck with terror it replied, 'Wert thou willing to surrender thine life, I would unfold unto thee the secret.' I agreed, and it said, laden with innuendo: – 'What a cannon! 'Tis a mighty fire dispensing dragon!'"

War service 

The gun was used by Ahmed Shah in the battle of Panipat, in 1761. After the battle, on his way back to Kabul, he left it at Lahore with his governor, Khawaja Ubed, as the carriage that was supposed to take the gun to Kabul was not ready. The other gun he took with him but that one was lost in passage through the Chenab.

In 1762, Dhillon Jat Ruler Maharaja Hari Singh Bhangi went into battle with Khawaja Ubed. Bhangi attacked the then-village of Khawaja Said two miles (3.2 km) from Lahore (now part of the city of Lahore), where the Mughal governor Khawaja Ubed had his arsenal, and seized his artillery, arms and ammunition. Amongst the guns captured was the Zamzama Gun itself. It was renamed by its Sikh captors Bhangi Toap.

For the next two years, it lay in the Shah Burj of the Lahore Fort. Thereafter, Raja Lehna Singh and Maharaja Gujjar Singh Bhangi got hold of it and they gave it to Sandhawalia Jat Ruler Charat Singh Shukerchakia as his share in the spoils. The Bhangi Sardars thought that Charat Singh would not be able to carry this gun with him and it would remain with them. Contrary to their expectations, Charat Singh successfully carried this gun to his fort at Gujranwala.

From Charat Singh, Zamzama was snatched by the Chathas who took it to Ahmadnagar where it became a bone of contention between the  brothers Ahmad Khan chatha and Pir Muhammad chatha. In the fight that ensued, two sons of Ahmad Khan and one of Pir Muhammad were killed. In this fight, Gujjar Singh Bhangi sided with Pir Muhammad. After the victory, the gun was restored to Gujjar Singh. After two years, the gun was wrested by Charat Singh Shukerchakia from whom it was once again snatched by the Pashtuns.

Next year, Raja Jhanda Singh Bhangi defeated the Pashtuns of Chatha and brought the gun to Amritsar. In 1802, Ranjit Singh, after defeating the Bhangis, got hold of the gun. He used it in the battles of Daska, Kasur, Sujanpur, Wazirabad and Multan. In the siege of Multan, the gun was badly damaged.

Decommissioning 

Zamzama was severely damaged due to its use in the aforementioned wars and it had to be brought back to Lahore, unfit for any further use. It was placed outside Delhi Gate, Lahore, where it remained until 1860. When in 1864, Maulawi Nur Ahmad Chishti compiled the TahqiqatiChishti, he found it standing in the Baradari of the garden of Wazir Khan, behind the Lahore Museum.

In 1870, it found a new asylum at the entrance of the Lahore Museum, then located in the Tollinton Market. It was placed in this position on the occasion of the Duke of Edinburgh’s visit to Lahore in 1870. When the present building of the museum was constructed it was removed further west and placed opposite the University Hall.

Repaired in 1977, the cannon now rests on Mall Road (Shahrah-e-Quaid-e-Azam) with Pharmacy Department, University of the Punjab on one side, and National College of Arts (NCA) and Lahore Museum on the other.

Other names 
It came to be known as Kim's Gun after the protagonist in the novel Kim by Rudyard Kipling, in whose childhood memoirs it is  frequently mentioned. The novel opens with Kim straddling the gun.

It was also called Bhangianwali Toap, because it was used by the Sikh chief Sardar Akali Phula Singh Bhangi. Maharaja Ranjit Singh requested Sadhu Singh Bhangi follower of Akali Phula Singh in 1802 and took the gun into his possession.[sic] Maharaja Ranjit Singh actually defeated Chet Singh Bhangi, son of Lehna Singh Bhangi (who had previously ruled over Lahore for more than 30 years as part of the 3 sardars of the Bhangi Misl). Hari Singh Bhangi was one of the greatest Sikh warriors ever and had died many years before Maharaja Ranjit Singh's birth.

Replica
A life-size replica of the gun is displayed at the Gobindgarh Fort in Amritsar.

References in popular culture 
Zamzama's status as a "mighty fire dispensing dragon" caused a great deal of amusement at the Durrani court, giving rise to many crude puns. "Zamzama" is now a joking term for a man with considerable sexual prowess in Afghanistan.

References

External links 

Individual cannons
Military history of Afghanistan
Tourist attractions in Lahore
Weapons of Afghanistan
The Mall, Lahore